Tromba Lontana (lit. "distant trumpet") is an orchestral fanfare written by the American minimalist composer John Adams in 1986. The work was commissioned by the Houston Symphony in commemoration of the 150th anniversary of Texas's declaration of independence from Mexico. The piece contains the voices of two trumpets that are separated from the orchestra, and from each other, usually performing in the balconies of the concert hall.

Tromba Lontana appears in the Modern Era soundtrack of Civilization IV, along with several other pieces by Adams.

A typical performance lasts just over four minutes.

Program note
John Adams wrote of the piece

Instrumentation
The work is scored for an orchestra comprising two flutes (both doubling piccolo), two oboes, two clarinets, four horns, two trumpets, percussion (glockenspiel, crotales, suspended cymbal and vibraphone), piano, harp, and strings.

References

Compositions by John Adams (composer)
1986 compositions
Compositions for trumpet
Compositions for symphony orchestra
Music commissioned by the Houston Symphony